Washington County Council may be:

 Washington County Council (Maryland) (#221)
 Washington County Council (New York) (#388)
 Washington County Council (Ohio) (#464)
 Washington County Council (Tennessee) (#559)
 Washington County Council (Pennsylvania) (#720)